Premćani is a small village in the municipality of Pljevlja, Montenegro. The village, a medieval site, was part of the medieval county of Tara. The monastery of Dovolja is located in the village.

Demographics
According to the 2003 census, the village had a population of 73 people (50,68% Montenegrins and 46,57% Serbs).

According to the 2011 census, its population was 49.

References

Populated places in Pljevlja Municipality